Arthur Metcalf (8 April 1889 – 9 February 1936) was an English professional footballer who played as a forward.

Career 
Metcalf played for a number of amateur clubs in the north-east, before earning a professional contract with Newcastle United in 1909. He could not break into the first team at St. James' Park, however, only making twelve first team appearances before joining Liverpool in 1912. His time at Anfield was largely successful, he finished as the club's top scorer in his first season with 28 goals, and featured in the FA Cup final a year later. Injury struck, however, and he missed much of the 1914–15 season. He was prolific during wartime football, but was not offered a new contract at the end of the conflict, and went on to have a journeyman career, playing for five more clubs before retiring in 1926. His brother, George, was also a professional footballer.

Personal life 
Metcalf served in the Royal Navy during the First World War.

References

External links
Profile at LFCHistory.net
Profile at www.swindon-town-fc.co.uk

1889 births
Footballers from Sunderland
1936 deaths
English footballers
Association football forwards
Hebburn Argyle F.C. players
Newcastle United F.C. players
Liverpool F.C. players
Stockport County F.C. players
Swindon Town F.C. players
Accrington Stanley F.C. (1891) players
Aberdare Athletic F.C. players
Norwich City F.C. players
Royal Navy personnel of World War I
FA Cup Final players